Francis E. Merritt (July 20, 1920 – March 21, 1995) was an American football tackle who played college football at the United States Military Academy.  He was elected to the College Football Hall of Fame in 1996. He served as the athletic director at the United States Air Force Academy from 1967 to 1974.

A 1939 graduate, Merritt played prep football at St. Cecilia High School in Englewood, New Jersey, where he was captain of the state champion team.

References

1920 births
1995 deaths
American football offensive tackles
Air Force Falcons athletic directors
Army Black Knights football players
College Football Hall of Fame inductees
Players of American football from New York City
St. Cecilia High School (New Jersey) alumni